Cyclidia javana is a moth in the family Drepanidae. It was described by Per Olof Christopher Aurivillius in 1894. It is found on Java and Borneo. The habitat consists of lowland forests.

The ground colour of the wings is white with diffuse brownish-grey markings.

References

Moths described in 1894
Cyclidiinae